Jorge de Paiva (13 May 1887 – 12 May 1937) was a Portuguese épée fencer. He competed individually at the 1920 Summer Olympics and with the Portuguese team in 1920, 1924 and 1928, and won a team bronze medal in 1928, placing fourth in 1920 and 1924.

References

External links
 

1887 births
1937 deaths
Portuguese male épée fencers
Olympic fencers of Portugal
Fencers at the 1920 Summer Olympics
Fencers at the 1924 Summer Olympics
Fencers at the 1928 Summer Olympics
Olympic bronze medalists for Portugal
Olympic medalists in fencing
Medalists at the 1928 Summer Olympics
19th-century Portuguese people
20th-century Portuguese people